The 2016 Hollywood Casino 400 was a NASCAR Sprint Cup Series race held on October 16, 2016, at Kansas Speedway in Kansas City, Kansas. Contested over 267 laps on the 1.5 mile (2.4 km) intermediate speedway, it was the 31st race of the 2016 NASCAR Sprint Cup Series season, fifth race of the Chase and second race of the Round of 12.

Report

Background

Kansas Speedway is a  tri-oval race track in Kansas City, Kansas. It was built in 2001 and it currently hosts two annual NASCAR race weekends. The Verizon IndyCar Series also raced at here until 2011. The speedway is owned and operated by the International Speedway Corporation.

Entry list

First practice

Qualifying

After qualifying, Kenseth said it was "nice to get a pole. I feel like our qualifying hasn't been nearly as good this year as it has been in the rest of the years I've been at JGR. We barely got it -- it was by a thousandth, or something like that. Obviously, our Camrys have been fast … Round one we were pretty decent -- it was off a little bit -- and then round three it was just right. We almost got beat, but it was as good of a lap as we were going to run. They did a good job today."

Kyle Busch, who qualified second, said his car "was pretty good. We certainly felt pretty happy with it earlier today and through practice and having a fast car there. So that was really strong in showing the speed that we have. Just trying to mimic that here today in qualifying.  I felt like we did a really good job of that in the second round and I felt even better about my lap in the third round but Matt was just able to get a little bit more out of it. Certainly messed up a little bit just the way the car was balanced through 1 and 2 being prepared for it and being able to get the most out of it. I had to re-lift and get out of the gas in turn two so that’s probably where our time was."

Qualifying results

Practice (post-qualifying)

Second practice

Final practice
Kurt Busch went to a backup car after he suffered a right-front tire blowout, spun out exiting turn 4 and damaged the front end of his car going through the infield grass.

Race

First half

Under mostly sunny Kansas skies, Matt Kenseth led the field to the green flag at 2:34 p.m. Debris on the backstretch brought out the first caution of the race on lap 26. Brian Scott was sent to the tail end of the field on the restart for speeding on pit road.

The race restarted on lap 31. The second caution flew for a three-car wreck in turn 4 involving Aric Almirola, David Ragan and Scott. Almirola went on to finish 40th.

The race restarted on lap 42. The third caution of the race flew on lap 44 after Jamie McMurray suffered a right-front tire blowout and slammed the wall in turn 3 following contact with Alex Bowman in turn 2.

The race restarted on lap 48. Green flag stops started on lap 83. Kenseth pitted from the lead on lap 87 and handed it to Joey Logano. He pitted the next lap and handed the lead to Brad Keselowski. He pitted the next lap and handed the lead to Denny Hamlin. He pitted the next lap and handed the lead to Casey Mears. He pitted on lap 95 and the lead cycled back to Kenseth.

Martin Truex Jr., who was running in the top-10 and had a problem that prevented him from getting his car completely fueled up, made an unscheduled stop on lap 114. Truex said after the race that he "pitted when [he] had to and hoped for the best. It’s really all you could do. We had a good car when we were up front. It wasn’t great. We were too tight on the short runs to loose on the long runs and we battled the whole run just to try to be OK. And once we lost track position, that made everything worse and magnified it and just really fought all day to get back where we were and then pitted the last stop and only gave up a couple more spots and could never get it back.” Adding insult to injury, Josh Wise slammed the wall in turn 4 and brought out the fourth caution of the race. A. J. Allmendinger was sent to the tail end of the field on the restart for speeding on pit road.

The race restarted on lap 121. Kevin Harvick worked by the outside of Kenseth on the frontstretch to take the lead on lap 128. After working on Harvick for 15 laps, Chase Elliott got a run on him going into turn 1 and took the lead on lap 169. He pitted from the lead on lap 173 and handed it to Carl Edwards. He pitted the next lap and the lead cycled back to Elliott. However, he made an unscheduled stop for a left-rear tire rub. When asked what caused the tire rub, Elliott said he "really [didn't] know. I don't know if we got the left rear getting up on the race track, or something and it got into the fender and cut it down. I don't know what to do man, we were trying as hard as we can. We had such a good car today again, and....I don't know what to do. Just keep after it and try to move on." The lead went to Edwards on lap 176. At the same time, Kyle Larson slammed the wall in turn 2 and brought out the fifth caution of the race.

Second half
The race restarted on lap 184. The sixth caution flew with 77 laps to go after Keselowski got loose exiting turn 4, drove through the infield grass and destroyed the front-end of his car. Keselowski said after that he "spun out, got in the grass and tore the nose off. I probably could have raced a little bit less hard; you know, I had a big points gap coming here, with this format it's probably the smart thing to do. But I don't want to race like that. I want to race my guts out, I want to go for wins. I don't want to points race. I don't care what the damn format is, I'm going to go out and give it my best.”

The race restarted with 69 laps to go. When Keselowski returned to the race with 45 laps to go, his engine let go, dropped fluid on the track in turn 3 and brought out the seventh caution of the race. Austin Dillon exited pit road first after taking right-side tires. Hamlin was sent to the tail end of the field on the restart for an uncontrolled tire.

The race restarted with 42 laps to go. Edwards made easy work of Dillon on the restart to retake the lead. The eighth caution of the race flew with 34 laps to go after Regan Smith slammed the wall in turn 3.

The race restarted with 30 laps to go. Harvick got the better of Edwards on the restart and retook the lead. Elliott's day went from bad to worse when he suffered a left-rear tire blowout, started losing speed and made another unscheduled stop. Harvick drove on to score the victory.

Post-race

Driver comments
In victory lane, Harvick said of his motivation following disappointing runs at Dover and Charlotte that he thought "the best thing is that we prepare this thing for every race. I try every week to find something to motivate myself and I know these guys do the same thing.  It’s hard to keep yourself motivated and continue to perform at a high level. Being able to do it for three years now says a lot about the character of this team and the things that they do.  It is like they say, anything that is really, really hard to get and come by, there are going to be some obstacles and some bumps in the road. I am just really proud of everyone at Stewart-Haas Racing.”

Edwards said that he "ran well, and that was really fun, we raced out front,” Edwards said. “It is really tough for me to finish second here. ... We'll just move forward. A day or two will pass, and maybe this thing will wear off, and I'll be more excited about the points situation going into Talladega, because that's the bright side.” He expanded on coming up short again at his self-described home track saying there are "so many people that come to this racetrack that support me and have supported me. Not just when I’m racing here, but Capitol Speedway, Old Summit, Callaway Raceway, Godfrey, all these places I raced growing up. It’s a really special place for me. As much fun as I had racing up front, yeah, it stings. There are negative emotions tied to not winning here with that fast of a car. But that's the way it goes.”

Race results

Race summary
 Lead changes: 10 among different drivers
 Cautions/Laps: 8 for 38
 Red flags: 0
 Time of race: 3 hours, 0 minutes and 28 seconds
 Average speed:

Media

Television
NBC covered the race on the television side. Rick Allen, Jeff Burton and Steve Letarte had the call in the booth for the race. Dave Burns, Mike Massaro, Marty Snider and Kelli Stavast will handle pit road on the television side.

Radio
MRN had the radio call for the race, which was simulcast on Sirius XM NASCAR Radio.

Standings after the race

Drivers' Championship standings

Manufacturers' Championship standings

Note: Only the first 16 positions are included for the driver standings.

References

2016 in sports in Kansas
2016 NASCAR Sprint Cup Series
NASCAR races at Kansas Speedway
October 2016 sports events in the United States